The Bass Rock Lighthouse on Bass Rock is a  lighthouse, built in 1902 by David Stevenson, who demolished the 13th-century keep, or governor's house, and some other buildings within the castle for the stone. The commissioners of the Northern Lighthouse Board decided that a lighthouse should be erected on the Bass Rock in July 1897 along with another light at Barns Ness near Dunbar. The cost of constructing the Bass Rock light was £8,087, a light first being shone from the rock on the evening of 1 November 1902. It has been unmanned since 1988 and is remotely monitored from the board's headquarters in Edinburgh. Until the automation the lighthouse was lit by incandescent gas obtained from vaporised paraffin oil converted into a bunsen gas for heating a mantle. Since that time a new biform ML300 synchronised bifilament 20-watt electric lamp has been used.

See also

 List of Northern Lighthouse Board lighthouses
 Northern Lighthouse Board

References

External links
 Northern Lighthouse Board 

Lighthouses completed in 1902
Lighthouses of Scottish islands
Category C listed lighthouses
Category C listed buildings in East Lothian
Tourist attractions in East Lothian
North Berwick